Leonard Horace Phillips (11 September 1922 – 9 December 2011) was a professional footballer who won three caps for the England national team.

Phillips was born in Shoreditch, London. At club level, he played his entire professional career for Portsmouth, and was a member of the championship-winning teams of 1949 and 1950.

After his professional career, Phillips went on to play non-league football for Poole Town, Chelmsford City, Bath City and Waterlooville, the latter while working as a lathe operator at De Havilland's works in Portsmouth. He made his last appearance in senior football at the age of 44, in a 3-0 win for Waterlooville against Andover on 24 September 1966. After that, Phillips appeared for several years in occasional charity matches for the Pompey ex-Professionals team.

Phillips died in Portsmouth on 9 December 2011.

References

External links
 
 

1922 births
2011 deaths
Footballers from Shoreditch
English footballers
England international footballers
Association football inside forwards
Portsmouth F.C. players
Poole Town F.C. players
Chelmsford City F.C. players
Bath City F.C. players
Waterlooville F.C. players
English Football League players
Ramsgate F.C. players
English Football League representative players
Royal Marines personnel of World War II